Matthew George (born 19 June 1953) is a Dominican cricketer. He played in four first-class and two List A matches for the Windward Islands in 1974/75 and 1975/76.

See also
 List of Windward Islands first-class cricketers

References

External links
 

1953 births
Living people
Dominica cricketers
Windward Islands cricketers